The Stalag riddim (or Stalag version) is a popular reggae riddim, which came to prominence in the 1970s. It was originally written and performed as "Stalag 17" (named after the 1953 war film) by Ansel Collins, and released by Winston Riley's Techniques record label in 1973.

It was mainly used for dub instrumental versions, often b-sides of records. The rhythm also influenced early hip-hop, and can be discerned on Public Enemy's hit 'Don't Believe the Hype' as well as on Too Short's Blowjob Betty. In 1980, reggae superstar Bob Marley's band The Wailers used the riddim as an introductory theme to the Uprising Tour concerts, with keyboardist Tyrone Downie chanting "Marley!" over the riddim while Marley comes to the stage (therefore the intro is commonly called "Marley Chant" among fans).

In 1982 it successfully made the transition into dancehall, e.g. with Sister Nancy's hit "Bam Bam".

References

External links
 Stalag Riddim (1973) at Frenkieh Riddim Database

Dub music
Riddims

pl:Stalag riddim